Paraclinus ditrichus, the Leastfoot blenny, is a species of labrisomid blenny native to the Pacific coast of Mexico at depths of from near the surface to .

References

ditrichus
Fish described in 1969
Fish of Mexican Pacific coast